Synanthedon tipuliformis, known as the currant clearwing, is a moth of the family Sesiidae. It is endemic to the Palearctic realm, but is an invasive species in the Nearctic realm and the Australasian realm.

Description
The moths have transparent wings, which are scaled only on the wing veins, the discal spot and the wing edges. The scales shine in blue-black shades. At the apex of the forewings there are weakly formed reddish or yellowish longitudinal stripes. In the middle, an elongated black-brown discal spot can be seen, which extends from the front to the back edge. The hind wings have a narrow dark marginal band and a small black-brown discal spot. The antennae are black and yellow dusty on the underside. The black thorax has lateral yellow stripes. On segments two, four, six and seven of the black abdomen there are thin yellow rings in the males. Female moths show equally coloured rings on segments two, four and six. The tufts are strongly fan-shaped and of blue-black color.

Similar species
There is a great similarity to the following species:

Spuler's Clearwing (Synanthedon spuleri)
Synanthedon conopiformis)
Fir Clearwing (Synanthedon cephiformis)
Sallow Clearwing (Synanthedon flaviventris)
Mistletoe Clearwing (Synanthedon loranthi)

A reliable determination of the species should be carried out by specialists, since the differences in external appearance are very small.

Biology
The moth flies from April to July depending on the location.

The larvae feed on Ribes species, including Ribes nigrum, Ribes rubrum and Ribes uva-crispa. They bore into the stems to feed.

Life cycle

References

Content in this edit is translated from the existing German Wikipedia article at :de:Synanthedon tipuliformis; see its history for attribution.

External links

Currant clearwing at UKmoths
Australian Faunal Directory
Australian Insects
Lepiforum.de

Sesiidae
Moths described in 1759
Moths of Japan
Moths of Africa
Moths of Europe
Moths of New Zealand
Taxa named by Carl Alexander Clerck